Bavaria-Munich was a duchy that was a constituent state of the Holy Roman Empire from 1392 to 1505.

History
After the death of Stephen II in 1375, his sons Stephen III, Frederick, and John II jointly ruled Bavaria-Landshut. After seventeen years, the brothers decided to formally divide their inheritance. John received Bavaria-Munich, Stephen  received Bavaria-Ingolstadt, while Frederick kept what remained of Bavaria-Landshut. In 1429 portions of Bavaria-Straubing including the city of Straubing were united with Bavaria-Munich. The duchy existed for a little more than a hundred years before Bavaria was reunited under Albert IV, Duke of Bavaria.

References 

 

Former states and territories of Bavaria
History of Munich
Duchy of Bavaria
Duchies of the Holy Roman Empire